Mélanie Clément (born 3 May 1992) is a French judoka. She won one of the bronze medals in the women's 48 kg event at the 2021 European Judo Championships held in Lisbon, Portugal. She competed at the World Judo Championships in 2017, 2018, 2019 and 2021.

Career 

In 2019, she won one of the bronze medals in the women's 48 kg event at the Judo World Masters held in Qingdao, China. In January 2020, she won one of the bronze medals in the women's 48 kg event at the Judo Grand Prix Tel Aviv held in Tel Aviv, Israel. In the same year, she lost her bronze medal match in the women's 48 kg event at the 2020 European Judo Championships held in Prague, Czech Republic.

At the 2021 Judo Grand Slam Abu Dhabi held in Abu Dhabi, United Arab Emirates, she won one of the bronze medals in her event.

Achievements

References

External links
 

Living people
1992 births
Place of birth missing (living people)
French female judoka
European Games competitors for France
Judoka at the 2019 European Games
People from Chaumont, Haute-Marne
Sportspeople from Haute-Marne
20th-century French women
21st-century French women